Ola Per Andersson, (born 1 July 1966) is a Swedish former professional footballer and current director of football at IK Sirius. He also works as a football expert on television.

Career
A midfielder, Andersson grew up in Uppsala and played for Bälinge IF, before being bought by IF Brommapojkarna in 1987 he played for the team until 1989. He started to play for IK Sirius in Division 1 Norra until 1994. He then was bought by the Allsvenskan team AIK. After seven matches with the team Andersson was selected by the Swedish national football team and played two matches in Umbro Cup in England. With AIK Andersson won Allsvenskan in 1998 and three gold and two silver models at Svenska Cupen.

After his football career was over he became an expert commentator for Canal Plus football broadcasts. He commentated the Fifa World Cup 2002 for SVT.

References

External links

Living people
1966 births
Swedish footballers
Association football midfielders
Sweden international footballers
Allsvenskan players
IF Brommapojkarna players
IK Sirius Fotboll players
AIK Fotboll players
Vasalunds IF players
Swedish television personalities
People from Österåker Municipality
Sportspeople from Stockholm County